The Battle of Wuchale was fought at Wuchale, Ethiopia, on March 14, 1782, between the forces of Emperor Tekle Giyorgis I and a force of Oromo. The Emperor's forces won the battle.

References 

Conflicts in 1782
1782 in Africa
Battles involving Ethiopia